Jan Geurt Siebelink (born 13 February 1938 in Velp, Gelderland) is a Dutch author. In 2005, he wrote the novel Knielen op een bed violen (literally , translated into English as In my father's garden) that sold over 700,000 copies. In 1991, he won the Ferdinand Bordewijk Prijs for De overkant van de rivier.

Bibliography
Selected works:
Nachtschade (1975)
Een lust voor het oog (1977)
J.K. Huysmans, Tegen de keer (1977)
Weerloos (1978)
Oponthoud (1979)
De herfst zal schitterend zijn (1980)
De reptielse geest (1981)
En joeg de vossen door het staande koren (1982)
Arnhem. Beeld en verbeelding (1983)
Koning Cophetua en het bedelmeisje (1983)
De hof van onrust (1984)
De prins van nachtelijk Parijs (1985)
Ereprijs (1986)
Met afgewend hoofd (1986)
Schaduwen in de middag (1987)
De overkant van de rivier (1990)
Hartje zomer en andere verhalen (1991)
Pijn is genot (1992)
Met een half oog (1992)
Verdwaald gezin (1993)
Laatste schooldag (1994)
Dorpsstraat Ons Dorp (1995)
Vera (1997)
Daar gaat de zon nooit onder (1998)
Schuldige hond (1998)
De bloemen van Oscar Kristelijn (1998)
Bergweg 17, Bosweg 19 (1999)
Mijn leven met Tikker (1999)
Engelen van het duister (2001)
Margaretha (2002)
Knielen op een bed violen (2005)
De kwekerij (2007)
Suezkade (2008)
Het lichaam van Clara (2011)
Oscar (2012)
Daniël in de vallei (2013)
De blauwe nacht (2014)
Margje (2015)

See also 
Franca Treur
Maarten 't Hart

References

External links
  

1938 births
Living people
People from Rheden
20th-century Dutch novelists
20th-century Dutch male writers
21st-century Dutch novelists
Ferdinand Bordewijk Prize winners
Dutch male novelists
21st-century Dutch male writers